Craig Eaton (born September 7, 1954) is a former Major League Baseball pitcher who played for one season. He was a pitcher who pitched in five games for the Kansas City Royals during the 1979 season. He played college baseball at Florida State University.

Craig attended Lake Worth Community High School (Lake Worth Beach, FL) and graduated in the class of 1972 at the age of 17. He went to Miami-Dade College (Miami, FL) for 2 years and was drafted by the Kansas City Royals in the 6th round of the 1974 MLB June Amateur Draft. He declined the draft to complete his B.S. in Marine Biology at Florida State University. He signed with the Kansas City Royals on June 25 as a free agent after graduating, and was called up to the major leagues toward the end of the 1979 season.

Eaton was sent to the California Angels on April 1, 1980, to complete a transaction from four months prior on December 6, 1979, when the Royals acquired Willie Aikens and Rance Mulliniks for Al Cowens and Todd Cruz. At the Angel's organization he played in the Triple-A Pacific Coast League (PCL), followed by Triple-A for the Detroit Tigers in 1983 and finished his career with the Montreal Expos in 1984. In the 1983 off-season, Craig sustained knee injuries on a golf course and had the first of three knee surgeries after completing the 1984 season.

Craig married his high school sweetheart, Suzanne Sullivan, in 1977 and they have 4 daughters. He currently lives in Lake Worth Beach, Florida.

References

External links

Retrosheet
Venezuelan Professional Baseball League

1954 births
Baseball players from Ohio
Daytona Beach Islanders players
Evansville Triplets players
Florida State Seminoles baseball players
Gulf Coast Royals players
Indianapolis Indians players
Jacksonville Suns players
Kansas City Royals players
Leones del Caracas players
American expatriate baseball players in Venezuela
Living people
Major League Baseball pitchers
Miami Dade Sharks baseball players
Omaha Royals players
People from Glendale, Ohio
Salt Lake City Gulls players
Spokane Indians players
Waterloo Royals players
People from Lake Worth Beach, Florida
Anchorage Glacier Pilots players